The 2021–22 Djibouti Division 2 was the 2021–22 edition of the Djibouti Division 2, the second-tier football league in Djibouti. The season began on 22 October 2021 and ended on 26 March 2022. The 20,000-capacity El Hadj Hassan Gouled Aptidon Stadium and 3,000-capacity Centre Technique National are the main venues of the league.

Standings

References

Football leagues in Djibouti
Premier League
Premier League
Djibouti